is a Japanese footballer currently playing as a right-back for Roasso Kumamoto.

Career statistics

Club
.

Notes

References

1999 births
Living people
Sportspeople from Yokohama
Association football people from Kanagawa Prefecture
Sendai University alumni
Japanese footballers
Association football defenders
J2 League players
Roasso Kumamoto players